Local elections were held in the province of Cavite on May 13, 2013 within the Philippine general election. Voters selected candidates for all local positions: a mayor, vice mayor, councilors, members of the Sangguniang Panlalawigan, the vice-governor, governor and representatives for the seven districts of Cavite.

Incumbent Juanito Victor C. Remulla of the Nacionalista Party, Lakas–CMD and the local party Partido Magdalo ran for a second term and defeated 3rd District Representative Ayong Maliksi, his gubernatorial predecessor.

Remulla and Maliksi's running mates are both sons of incumbent senators. Remulla ran with actor and Liga ng mga Barangay (League of Barangays) Provincial Chapter President Jolo Revilla of Lakas–CMD, son of senator Bong Revilla, while Ronald Jay Lacson, son of outgoing senator Panfilo Lacson, ran with Maliksi. Revilla went on to defeat Lacson by a comfortable margin.

Opinion polling

Gubernatorial election

According to a survey conducted on 1,300 respondents by the Laylo Research Strategies (LRS) on April 14–21, Remulla led Maliksi by 14% or about 148,000 votes. The exact percentage of the respondents who will vote for the candidates was not shown.

Vice gubernatorial election

Provincial elections
The candidates for governor and vice governor with the highest number of votes wins the seat; they are voted separately, therefore, they may be of different parties when elected.

Gubernatorial election
Parties are as stated in their certificate of candidacies.

Juanito Victor C. Remulla is the incumbent.  Although he ran under the Alyansang Lakas at Magdalo (Alliance of Lakas and Magdalo), which was dominated by Lakas–CMD candidates, he was still a member of the Nacionalista Party, which was affiliated with the Liberal coalition to which Maliksi belonged.

Vice-gubernatorial election
Parties are as stated in their certificate of candidacies.

Incumbent Recto Cantimbuhan, who was replaced as the Liberal Party's candidate by Lacson, ran as Independent.

Congressional elections 

Each of Cavite's seven legislative districts elected a representative to the House of Representatives.

1st District
The seat was vacated when Joseph Emilio Abaya was appointed as DOTC Secretary. His brother Francis "Blue" Abaya is his party's nominee for the seat. He ran against former Kawit Mayor Federico "Hit" Poblete of the Nacionalista Party. Director Joel Lamangan, who was going to run under the local party Partido Magdalo, withdrew his candidacy.

2nd District (Bacoor)
Lani Mercado-Revilla is the incumbent. She faced off against former Bacoor Mayor Jessie Castillo.

3rd District (Imus City)
Incumbent Ayong Maliksi ran for Governor. Former Board Member Alex Advincula is his party's nominee for the seat.

4th District (Dasmariñas)

Elpidio Barzaga, Jr. is the incumbent and was also nominated by the Liberal Party.

5th District
Roy Loyola is the incumbent and ran unopposed, his opponent Silang Mayor Clarito "Areng" Poblete (Lakas) did not run.

6th District
Incumbent Antonio Ferrer ran for Mayor of General Trias; his brother, incumbent General Trias mayor Luis Ferrer IV is the party's nominee for the seat, he is also nominated by their old party, Lakas CMD. He squared off against former vice governor Dencito Campaña.

7th District
Jesus Crispin Remulla is in his third consecutive term and is ineligible to run; his brother, former representative Gilbert Remulla is his party's nominee for the seat, and also nominated by Lakas. Remulla squared off against Tagaytay mayor Abraham Tolentino.

Provincial Board elections
All 7 Districts of Cavite elected Sangguniang Panlalawigan or provincial board members. The first two candidates who obtained the highest number of votes were elected. Names in italics denote the incumbents.

1st District
City: Cavite City
Municipality: Kawit, Noveleta, Rosario
Parties are as stated in their certificate of candidacies.

|-bgcolor=black
|colspan=5|

|-

|-

2nd District (Bacoor)
City: Bacoor
Parties are as stated in their certificate of candidacies.

|-bgcolor=black
|colspan=5|

|-

|-

3rd District (Imus City)

City: Imus City
Parties are as stated in their certificate of candidacies.

|-bgcolor=black
|colspan=5|

|-

|-

4th District (Dasmariñas)

City: Dasmariñas
Incumbents Teofilo Lara and Raul Rex Mangubat ran unopposed. Parties are as stated in their certificate of candidacies.

|-

|-

5th District
Municipality: Carmona, General Mariano Alvarez, Silang
Parties are as stated in their certificate of candidacies.

|-bgcolor=black
|colspan=5|

|-

|-

6th District
City: Trece Martires City
Municipality: Amadeo, General Trias, Tanza
Parties are as stated in their certificate of candidacies.

|-bgcolor=black
|colspan=5|

|-

|-

7th District
City: Tagaytay
Municipality: Alfonso, Bailen, Indang, Magallanes, Maragondon, Mendez, Naic, Ternate
Parties are as stated in their certificate of candidacies.

|-bgcolor=black
|colspan=5|

|-

|-

City and municipal elections
All cities and municipalities of Cavite elected a mayor and vice-mayor this election. The candidates for mayor and vice mayor with the highest number of votes wins the seat; they are voted separately, therefore, they may be of different parties when elected. Below is the list of mayoralty and vice-mayoralty candidates of each city and municipalities per district. Names in italics denote the incumbents.

1st District
City: Cavite City
Municipality: Kawit, Noveleta, Rosario

Cavite City

Kawit

Noveleta

Rosario

2nd District
City: Bacoor

Bacoor

3rd District
City: Imus City

Imus City

4th District
City: Dasmariñas

Dasmariñas

5th District
Municipality: Carmona, General Mariano Alvarez, Silang

Carmona

General Mariano Alvarez

Silang

6th District
City: Trece Martires City
Municipality: Amadeo, General Trias, Tanza

Trece Martires City

Amadeo

General Trias

Tanza

7th District
City: Tagaytay
Municipality: Alfonso, Bailen, Indang, Magallanes, Maragondon, Mendez, Naic, Ternate

Tagaytay

Alfonso

Bailen
Note: Bailen was listed as General Emilio Aguinaldo, its former name, in the ballots.

Indang

Magallanes

Maragondon

Mendez

Naic

Ternate

References

2013 Philippine local elections
Elections in Cavite
May 2013 events in the Philippines
2013 elections in Calabarzon